David Sherwood is a British tennis coach and retired tennis player. In his only live Davis Cup match, Sherwood played doubles with Andy Murray beating the Israeli World No 4 doubles team of Jonathan Erlich and Andy Ram,

Early and personal life

Career
In 1997 he won the Australian Open boys' doubles title with fellow Brit James Trotman. They defeated South African pairing Jaco van der Westhuizen and Wesley Whitehouse 7-6, 6-3 in the final.

Sherwood, won futures tournaments in Wrexham and Edinburgh, and also reached the semi-final in Mulhouse and the final in Plaisir, France.

By 2003, Sherwood had acquired a reputation for a lackadaisical attitude, a party loving life style and negatively influencing younger players.
While at a Jamaica Futures event in November 2003, Sherwood delivered an on-court barrage at his Lawn Tennis Association coach. Back in the UK, he missed a training session claiming he was ill, despite living five minutes away from the LTA's headquarters with an on-site doctor. Next day, the LTA's team manager Mark Petchey expelled him from the LTA.

With the support of his parents, Sherwood put his tennis career back on track. By November 2004, Mark Petchey was funding his coaching throughout the winter.

In March 2005 Sherwood played doubles with Andy Murray in their joint Davis Cup debuts for the Europe/Africa Zone Group I match against Israel. Surprisingly, Sherwood/Murray beat the World No 4 doubles team of Jonathan Erlich and Andy Ram, to help Great Britain win 3-2. He entered the singles at Wimbledon in 2005, and defeated Ricardo Mello in the first round before losing to Feliciano López.

In September 2005, at the World Group Play-off against Switzerland, Sherwood was beaten in the first singles dead rubber, with Great Britain losing 5-0.

Since retiring from playing in 2008, Sherwood became a nationally recognised Lawn Tennis Association coach, coaching top performance players in the country.

ATP Challenger and ITF Futures finals

Singles: 9 (3–6)

Doubles: 31 (16–15)

Junior Grand Slam finals

Doubles: 1 (1 title)

References

External links

 
 

English male tennis players
Sportspeople from Sheffield
British male tennis players
Living people
1980 births
Tennis people from South Yorkshire
Australian Open (tennis) junior champions
Grand Slam (tennis) champions in boys' doubles